Marked for Murder is a 1945 American Western film written and directed by Elmer Clifton. The film stars Dave O'Brien, Tex Ritter and Guy Wilkerson, with Marilyn McConnell, Ed Cassidy and Henry Hall. The film was released on 8 February 1945, by Producers Releasing Corporation.

Plot
The Texas Rangers try to manage a dispute between sheepherders and cattle ranchers.

Cast 
Tex Ritter as Tex Haines
Dave O'Brien as Texas Ranger Dave Wyatt
Guy Wilkerson as 	Texas Ranger Panhandle Perkins
Marilyn McConnell as Ruth Lane
Ed Cassidy as Dick Vernon
Henry Hall as Sheriff Jim Whitlock
Charles King as Henchman Pete Magoo
Jack Ingram as Sam Taylor
Bob Kortman as Henchman
The Milo Twins as Musicians

Soundtrack 
 Tex Ritter - "Long Time Gone" (Written by Tex Ritter and Frank Harford)
 Tex Ritter - "Tears of Regret" (Written by Don Weston)
 Milo Twins - "Great Grand-Dad"

See also
The Texas Rangers series:
 The Rangers Take Over (1942)
 Bad Men of Thunder Gap (1943)
 West of Texas (1943)
 Border Buckaroos (1943)
 Fighting Valley (1943)
 Trail of Terror (1943)
 The Return of the Rangers (1943)
 Boss of Rawhide (1943)
 Outlaw Roundup (1944)
 Guns of the Law (1944)
 The Pinto Bandit (1944)
 Spook Town (1944)
 Brand of the Devil (1944)
 Gunsmoke Mesa (1944)
 Gangsters of the Frontier (1944)
 Dead or Alive (1944)
 The Whispering Skull (1944)
 Marked for Murder (1945)
 Enemy of the Law (1945)
 Three in the Saddle (1945)
 Frontier Fugitives (1945)
 Flaming Bullets (1945)

References

External links 

1945 films
1940s English-language films
Films directed by Elmer Clifton
American black-and-white films
1945 Western (genre) films
American Western (genre) films
Producers Releasing Corporation films
1940s American films